Haddadan (also Romanized as Ḩaddādan; also known as Haddadan Garmadooz) is a village in Seyyedan Rural District, Abish Ahmad District, Kaleybar County, East Azerbaijan Province, Iran. At the 2006 census, its population was 629, in 152 families.

References 

Populated places in Kaleybar County